The Keyboard suite in D minor (437) was composed by George Frideric Handel, for solo keyboard (harpsichord), between 1703 and 1706. It is also referred to as  Vol. 2 No. 4. It was first published in 1733.

Movements
The work consists of five movements:

In popular culture
The Sarabande was used in an orchestral arrangement for the Stanley Kubrick period drama film Barry Lyndon (1975).

It was used for the funeral of a Venetian printer in James Burke's Connections.

Dutch singer Petra Berger used the Sarabande as the musical setting for her song about Mary, Queen of Scots, "Still a Queen (In My End Is My Beginning)", from her album Eternal Woman (2001).

The Sarabande was featured in the episode "Warp and Weft" (2017; S02E03) of the second season of the ITV period drama TV series Victoria.

An orchestral version of the Sarabande was used on the first episode of The ABC Murders (2018), a television mini-series based on the Agatha Christie novel The A.B.C. Murders (1936), starring John Malkovich as Poirot.

Dave Gorman's Modern life is goodish uses it to accompany his 'found poetry'.

See also

Keyboard works by George Frideric Handel

References

External links

Suites by George Frideric Handel
1706 compositions
Compositions in D minor

zh-yue:D 小調鍵盤組曲 HMV 437